"Heaven Help Me", a song by Deon Estus from the album Spell
 "Heaven Help Me", a song by Lizzo from the album Cuz I Love You
 "Heaven Help Me", a song by Rob Thomas from the album The Great Unknown
 "Heaven Help Me", a song by Wynonna Judd from the album What the World Needs Now Is Love